Danica Bandić Telečki (30 September 1871, in Zagreb, Austria-Hungary – 26 October 1950, in Belgrade, Yugoslavia) was a Serbian writer.

Biography 

She was born in Zagreb in 1871 to mother Ana and father Laza Telečki, actor and playwright. While she was only 19 months old, her father passed away, and her mother Ana would follow when Danica was only eight years old. She was taken care of by her uncle, playwright Serbian National Theater, "Rista Telečki", who educated Danica and tried not to make her feel the emptiness and difficulty of growing up without parents..

Education 

In the period from 1877 to 1881, she attended primary school in Zrenjanin, and then in  Kikindi. After finishing primary school, Danica went to Subotica, where she enrolled in the "Higher Girls' School" in 1881 and graduated in 1888. Due to the great success in school, Danica enrolled in the "Teacher's School in Sombor right after high school, which she also finished with great success.

Family 

After being employed at the school in Kikinda, Danica married Miloš Bandić, who was a teacher, school principal, actor, member of the "Serbian National Council" and delegate of the "Grand National Assembly of Vojvodina". Her husband supported her in teaching, and after retiring and moving to Belgrade in 1922, in both writing and translating. Miloš Bandic passed away in 1941 in Belgrade.

From her marriage to Bandić, she bore two children, Milana Bata and Jelisaveta Milica Bandić, who were both actors.

Milica was an actress National Theater in Belgrade, who during World War I played in the "Bosnia and Herzegovina Traveling Theater". Their son Milan Bata Bandić played in a large number of theatres across the country, and he died at the age of 37.

Career 
After graduating from the "Teacher's College", Danica was first employed in 1888 at the age of seventeen in Kikinda. As a teacher in 1890, she received from the Serbian National Theater 1000 forints collected by friends of the theatre and admirers of Laza Telečki. Danica began her literary work by publishing short stories, notably "By Force in Preparation" for the magazine Women's World, of which she later became an associate editor. She was a professional translator and knew several languages, capable of translating works from German to Russian even. She wrote the humorous game "Emancipated", for which [Matica Srpska] gave her an award and mention in its organ Letopis (Chronicle). Some of her plays were performed in the Serbian National Theater in 1922. Danica retired as a teacher and moved with her husband to Belgrade, where she continued to write and translate.

She published her most significant story, "Tera Baba Kozlice" in 1923, with illustrations by a Serbian painter Uroš Predić. After that, she published a large number of titles, such as "Farewell to Sneško Belić", "A Full Circle of Stories", "What a Swallow Tells" and many others. 

During her writing career, she also published some twenty books of stories and plays. her first works were aimed at adults and later she turned to children's literature. Owing to the great achievements she accomplished in the field of children's literature, Marko Car, the literary critic called Danica "Uncle Job in prose".

She collaborated with a large number of magazines: Women's World (from 1892—1902, 1904, 1906, 1908, 1911), "Monument" children's magazine (1893—1897, 1908, Bosanska vila (1895—1901, 1903, 1905, 1907, 1908), Letopis Matica srpska (1895), Brankovo kolo (1896, 1898-1899, 1902-1904, 1906, 1908-1910).

See also
 List of Serbian women writers

References 

19th-century Serbian writers
20th-century Serbian writers
Serbian women writers
1871 births
1950 deaths